Lord Hunt may refer to:

 John Hunt, Baron Hunt (1910–1998), British army officer, the leader of the 1953 British Expedition to Mount Everest
 John Hunt, Baron Hunt of Fawley (1905–1987), general practitioner 
 John Hunt, Baron Hunt of Tanworth (1919–2008), British civil servant and politician
 Julian Hunt, Baron Hunt of Chesterton (born 1941), former Director General and Chief Executive of the UK Meteorological Office
 David Hunt, Baron Hunt of Wirral (born 1942), British Conservative politician
 Philip Hunt, Baron Hunt of Kings Heath (born 1949), former health administrator and Labour minister

See also
 Norman Crowther Hunt, Baron Crowther-Hunt, (1920–1987), British scholar and Labour politician
 Marquess of Huntly, a title in the Peerage of Scotland